Eukaryotic translation initiation factor 3 subunit C like is a protein that in humans is encoded by the EIF3CL gene.

Function

The protein encoded by this gene is a core subunit of the eukaryotic translation initiation factor 3 (eIF3) complex. The encoded protein is nearly identical to another protein, eIF3c, from a related gene. The eIF3 complex binds the 40S ribosome and mRNAs to enable translation initiation. Several transcript variants encoding the same protein have been found for this gene. [provided by RefSeq, Dec 2015].

See also 
Eukaryotic initiation factor 3 (eIF3)

References

Further reading